The 2018 IIHF World U18 Championship Division III were two international under-18 men's ice hockey tournaments organized by the International Ice Hockey Federation. The group A and B tournaments are the sixth and seventh level of competition at the 2018 IIHF World U18 Championships.

Division III A
The Division III A tournament was played in Erzurum, Turkey, from 26 March to 1 April 2018.

Participants

Final standings

Results
All times are local. (Further-eastern European Time – UTC+3)

Division III B
The Division III B tournament was played in Queenstown, New Zealand, from 26 to 28 April 2018.

Participants

Final standings

Results
All times are local. (New Zealand Standard Time – UTC+12)

References

IIHF World U18 Championship Division III
2018 IIHF World U18 Championships
International ice hockey competitions hosted by Turkey
International ice hockey competitions hosted by New Zealand
Sport in Erzurum
Sport in Queenstown, New Zealand